Society in the Joseon dynasty was built upon Neo-Confucianist ideals, namely the three fundamental principles and five moral disciplines. There were four classes: the yangban nobility, the "middle class" jungin, sangmin, or the commoners, and the cheonmin, the outcasts at the very bottom. Society was ruled by the yangban, who constituted 10% of the population and had several privileges. Slaves were of the lowest standing.

During this period, the clan structure became stricter and bloodline was of utmost importance. Family life was regulated by law, strictly enforcing Confucian rituals. Compared to Goryeo practices before, marriage rituals were restructured and aggravated. Noblemen could have only one wife and several concubines but their children born from commoner or slave concubines were considered illegitimate and denied any yangban rights.

The roles and rights of women were reduced compared to previous eras in Korean history. Yangban women were completely hidden from the outer world and every woman had to conform to Confucian ideals of purity, obedience, chastity and faithfulness. Women were subjects of male dominance throughout their lives, obliged to listen to their fathers, husbands, fathers-in-law and firstborn sons. Homes were divided into male and female quarters to separate the sexes.

Guiding principles

Korean society was hierarchical during most of the Joseon era and the conscious, government-backed spreading of Neo-Confucianism reinforced this idea. Even though the philosophy originates in China, Korea also adopted and integrated it into daily life, transforming it to fit the nation's needs and developed it in a way that became specific to Korea.

Korean society in Joseon was built upon the three fundamental principles (samgang) and five moral disciplines (oryun):

 samgang:
chung: loyalty to the king
hyo: filial obedience to the parents
yeol: differentiation between men and women
 oryun:
 ui: righteousness and justice: the relationship between monarch and the people
 chin: warmth and closeness between parents and children
 byeol: differentiation between husband and wife
 seo: order between seniors and juniors
 sin: trust between friends

This means that Korean society placed utmost importance on hierarchy between classes, older and younger people, emphasized family values, the keeping of order and harmony and the inferior social status of women. Rituals became very important. Ceremonies paying respect to one's ancestors and the need for lifelong learning being highly valued. Neo-Confucians considered hard work, purity, politeness and refraining from improper behaviour as desirable and valuable human qualities. They could be regarded as prudish, since showing passionate emotions was something noble people were expected to avoid. It was important that everyone knew their standings in society and behaved accordingly. The Korean language reflects this notion even today, by the use of honorifics, which signal whether the speaker addresses a senior person or someone of a higher social standing.

Direct communication between the king and the common people was possible through the sangeon, a written petition system, and the gyeokjaeng, an oral petition system. Through the gyeokjaeng oral petition system, commoners could strike a gong or drum in front of the palace or during the king's public processions in order to appeal their grievances or petition to the king directly. This allowed even the illiterate members of Joseon society to make a petition to the king. More than 1,300 gyeokjaeng-related accounts are recorded in the Ilseongnok.

Structure

The basis of Joseon society was a system similar to caste systems. Historian Baek Ji-won considers the Korean system comparable to that of India. According to Michael Seth, the Korean system could, in principle, be compared to India's (apart from the religious connotations). In practice, however, classes may not have been as impenetrable and clearly separated as in India. Bruce Cumings, on the other hand, thinks that the Korean structure cannot be called a true caste system but a system where certain castes existed.

In theory, there were three social classes, but in practice, there were four. The top class were the yangban, or "scholar-gentry", the commoners were called sangmin or yangmin, and the lowest class was that of the cheonmin. Between the yangban and the commoners was a fourth class, the jungin, "middle people".

The ruling class and the recipient of privileges was the yangban class. This elite aristocracy was hereditary and held most of the wealth, slaves and land. They were also called sadaebu, "scholar-officials", because when compared to Goryeo aristocracy or the Japanese bushido, they were not landowners who engaged in military actions.

Yangban strove to do well at the royal examinations to obtain high positions in the government. They did not pay any form of taxes, and they avoided manual labor and conscription. However they had to excel in calligraphy, poetry, classical Chinese texts, and Confucian rites. In theory, commoners could apply for royal exams but in practice, from the 1600s, the family background of applicants was thoroughly checked and had to provide evidence of yangban status on their father's side up to three generations and one generation on the mother's side.

Nobles lived separately from commoners, in designated areas of a town or village and spent most of their free time at Confucian academies or gisaeng houses. Yangban families were rare in the northern and eastern parts of the country and on Jeju Island and were mostly demoted yangban that were exiled there. High government positions were filled by yangban from Gyeongsang and Chungcheong provinces mainly. The scholar-aristocracy made up about 10% of Korea's population.

Civilian offices (munban), as well as military posts (muban) were occupied by yangban men, with the latter being filled by provincial yangban, whose only way to obtain a scholarly certificate was to become military officials. The men were prepared for the exam by the muhak, the military schools. From the mid-Joseon period, they belonged to different lineages than the civilian officials.

Around 80% of Joseon society was made up of commoners, called sangmin. They were a free class, obliged to pay taxes, serve in the army, and undertake corvée labour. Peasants, artisans, fishermen and merchants made up this class, but merchants were regarded as lowly by yangban. Some peasants owned their lands, but others cultivated yangban property as tenants.

The last place on the social ladder was the outsider class, the cheonmin. Among this class were the shamans, butchers, and other people outside of the Buddhist norms of acceptability.

Slaves were divided into two groups: sanobi (private slaves) and gongnobi (slaves owned by the state). Both groups had "in-house slaves" (solgeo nobi) and "outside slaves" (oegeo nobi). The latter lived like any peasant, could own property and, just like peasants, gave a portion of the crop or textile tributes to their owners. This makes Korean history scholars debate whether they should even be considered slaves or serfs. The number of slaves fluctuated throughout the Joseon period: there were times when their numbers reached 30% of the population. Slaves could not have family names except for those who already had one when they became enslaved. So they could not invent their own last names. In theory, marriage between slaves and commoners was forbidden, but the rule was often ignored. By the end of the dynasty, the number of slaves declined. State slavery was abolished in 1800 while private slavery was finally banned in 1894.

Besides slaves, people of certain professions were also numbered among the cheonmin class. For example, professionals dealing with animal slaughter (butchers, people working with animal skins), most probably because of old Buddhist views. Innkeepers, gisaengs, entertainers, gravediggers, bark peelers, basket makers, shamans and ferrymen were also cheonmin people. It was a hereditary status, and their children were not allowed to advance on the social ladder.

The middle class, called jungin or chungin was a small but important one. They were below the yangban nobles but above the common people. They were usually "technical experts", such as interpreters, scribes, astronomers, accountants, physicians, jurists and musicians. Provincial small officeholders also belonged to this class. They oversaw local bureaucracy and so were impossible to overlook. Many of them became wealthy, some by exploiting peasants. In the 19th century, jungin who spoke foreign languages were the ones who introduced Western culture to Korea.

The jungin people also included the illegitimate children of yangban.  Born from commoner or slave concubines, they made up a substrate within the jungin, called seoeol. The illegitimate children of the scholar-gentry were not allowed to be recognised as yangban and so could not inherit land or wealth from their fathers or participate in government exams. Their fate caused much discussion among Confucian scholars, as recognising their existence would have meant that the well-defined lines between commoners and nobility would have been blurred.

Joseon society is special in that the elite class remained the same for many centuries. While there were constant wars, with different groups changing in top positions throughout Europe and Asia, the Korean ruling class remained largely untouched, from Goryeo times to the end of the Joseon dynasty. The structure of the social system also remained the same for five centuries, which is unique in the world.

Clans, family and marriage

Korea has a clan system, where every Korean belongs to a bongwan (본관) that can trace ancestry back to the founding father of the clan. Different clans may share certain surnames, differentiated by the founding city or town of the clan. Clan structure had existed well before the founding of Joseon but the spread of Confucianism made its rules stricter, dogmatized in state laws.

Clans are based upon paternal blood lineage, named jok, pa or munjung. The history of the clan, with birth, marriage and death details of its members are registered in the jokbo even today. This kind of registry making became regular in the 15th century. Traitors and sentenced criminals were expelled from the clan and from the lineage. Outsiders could not join a lineage.

Family life was regulated by the Gyeongguk daejeon, a code of law compiled in the 15th century. It regulated the jesa, the ancestor rituals, emphasizing that ancestors are important members of a lineage. Jesa is conducted by the oldest male family member of the deceased, the other family members line up behind him according to their ranks in the family. Rituals have strict rules and pre-set orders, with the type of sacrificial food and its placement order defined, as well. These rituals became common and solidified during the Joseon era.

 
Just like rituals, marriage also had stern rules to follow. While in Goryeo marriage within members of the same clan was permitted, Joseon took exogamy very seriously and forbade such marriages that violated the sharing of the last name, even if a clan had more than a million members. Michael Seth, professor of history at the James Madison University, claims that the reason for this was the adaptation of the gwageo, the government examination system of China, as well as the integration of Confucianism into everyday life, making proving one's lineage of utmost importance.

Marriage was conducted at a young age, in 1471 the lowest possible age was 15 for boys and 14 for girls. Men usually got married before the age of 30, women were typically married below 20. Commoners usually married at an earlier age than yangban class children. Significant age difference between husband and wife was daily occurrence. Marriage and married life rituals were regulated by Zhu Xi's Zhuzi Jiali (Juja garye), but customs were modified according to Korean traditions. For example, according to Confucian customs, wedding ceremonies were held at the house of the groom's father, however, in Korea the exact opposite had been the custom. As a compromise, a part of the ceremony was to be held at the bride's home, after which they would proceed to the groom's home. In Goryeo times, the newlyweds usually lived at the bride's home for years, but by adapting Confucianism this had to change. The bride had to move to her new family. In practice there were occasions when the couple chose to live where the parents had a bigger need of looking after or where land was more arable.

Koreans also adapted another Chinese custom, the minmyeoneuri, or child brides, when 6 and 7 years old girls were given off to marriage. They usually spent the years leading up to the actual wedding ceremony at their mothers-in-law's, where they worked as maids. This custom was not widespread and mainly observed by poor families, who could not afford to have a wedding otherwise. Because of such poor conditions, it could happen that the age difference between the bride and the groom was more than 30 years.

The most important possession for a Korean family was the firstborn son, or jangja. It had always been the case, but neo-Confucianism strengthened the idea even further. It was so important that no man could die without having a male heir. If they were unable to produce one, they had to adopt (from the same lineage). Most of the wealth and land of the family was inherited by the firstborn son, with the other sons getting small portions; girls were denied any such rights. Men were allowed to have more than one wife and several concubines.

Women

During the Goryeo dynasty women had considerable freedom. They could freely mingle with men, have their own possessions, and inherit land. That changed drastically during the second half of the Joseon era after the Imjin War, women's situation became gradually worse. Their life was regulated by Neo-Confucianism but in a much stricter way than in China, which started the philosophy.

Women had to conform to Confucian ideals. As children they were subordinated to their fathers, when they married, to their husbands, and when they got old, to their firstborn son. Being virtuous, which for women meant modesty, obedience and faithfulness, was required of them; virtuous women were rewarded by the state from 1434 with gradations in status and financial support. Yangban noblewomen were completely segregated from the rest of society. During the day they could not leave their homes, and if they had to, they were transported in a litter called gama. They were forbidden to play games and have fun outside their homes or they could be beaten with a stick called gangjo, which was a crooked oak branch that required exactly three leaves. These ideals and segregation could not completely be maintained into the lower classes, as commoner and slave women had various works to do. Nevertheless, even the peasant houses had separate rooms for men and women, and wealthier families had male and female quarters: "outer rooms" called sarangchae for men, and "inner rooms" called anche or anbang for women. By the end of the Joseon dynasty,low-class woman who had fulfilled their Confucian duties of bearing a son bared their breasts in public as a sign of pride. Noblewomen were forbidden to do so because they considered it to be, "low-class." However, many scholars doubt the veracity of the evidence for this trend.

Most women were illiterate, as the public schools taught males exclusively. Even after the introduction of hangul, when literacy improved, women who could read and write made up only 4% as late as the 19th century. Women of the yangban could receive an education from within the family, for instance the 18th century Crown Princess Lady Hyegyeong was taught to read and write hangul by an aunt-in-law. There were various women philosophers who wrote in favor of patriarchy, such as Im Yungjidang and Gang Jeongildang, though the modern feminist interpretation is that such women were only pretending. Women were not allowed to learn hanja, the Chinese characters used to write Korean. Women were also denied the right to participate in the jesa, the ancestor honoring rituals, which is also a significant divergence from the original Chinese practices.

Households headed by women disappeared at the beginning of the Joseon era, and they gradually lost their right to inheritance, as well. The reason was that marrying daughters off required expensive dowry, resulting in calling daughters dodungnyeo, "thieves". As according to the new Confucian ideals, women had to obey their in-laws after marriage, the birth family regarded it unnecessary to provide her inheritance in addition to the very expensive required dowry as aforementioned. Married daughters were often labelled chulga oein, "one who left the family and became a strange person". This was not a joke or sarcastic observation because Confucianism is humorless. Women had to obey their husbands and in-laws and had no right to apply for a divorce. Men could divorce their wives based on the chilgeojiak, the "seven sins": disobedience towards in-laws, inability to bear a son, adultery, jealousy, poor DNA, talkativeness and coin collecting.

Women were expected to be faithful to their husbands beyond death, so widows were not allowed to remarry in the latter part of the dynasty. In lower classes such marriages still happened, as families, for financial reasons, or personal vendettas, married off the burdensome widows to men who could not afford to marry otherwise. While the breaking of the rule in lower classes was widely ignored by authorities, yangban widows were forbidden to remarry, or their children would be cast out of the noble class. Members of the royal lineage were treated even more strictly, with Seongjong of Joseon ordering the execution of his cousin when he discovered she had cohabited with a male servant after being widowed, implying their sharing of the bed, a way to imply that they were engaged in sexual activities. As women could not be the heads of a household anymore, widows often were considered financial burdens and sometimes driven to commit suicide, unlike men today. Women were under the social norm expectation to protect their virtue at any cost, and by the late Joseon era they often wore small knives called paedo attached to the norigae (the colourful pendant hanging from the upper part of the hanbok), to commit suicide rather than dishonor their families even by giving cause to gossips.

Men could have second wives besides their first wife and have several concubines, as well. Being a second wife or a concubine of a nobleman was considered a rise on the social ladder for commoner or slave women, but their children were considered illegitimate and denied any yangban rights. First wives and legitimate children of noblemen often despised these women and their offspring like Cinderella or the Joseon 18th century equivalent, Chunhyang. Society considered these children outcasts unless they were literal royalty, in which case they were honored and feared.

Women could only have four types of "professions" in Joseon: they could become gungnyeo (palace womens), shamans, physicians or gisaeng. The latter, who are often compared to Japanese geisha, could live a freer life than most women and often likened themselves to floating butterflies or wild dogs in their poems. They could read and write, were skilled in music, arts, poetry and served as intellectual companions to men in a period where wives were not allowed to be true companions because of the Confucian restrictions. The most famous gisaeng is probably Hwang Jin-yi, who lived in the 16th century and is considered a role model of progressive, liberal, strong, feminist, self-conscious women in Korea.

Female physicians are rarely discussed in modern discourse because of the lack of scandalous stories surrounding them and interest in what Joseon did well, a phenomenon criticized as a form of Orientalism. 

Joseon era laws prohibited women from riding horses and playing sports such as go. By custom, houses had two entrances (one for men and women each) and the kitchen provided a physical separation between each gender's quarters. To ensure separation outside the home, certain hours of the day were marked by a ringing bell, this notified the times when only women would be allowed on the streets. Even women from the upper-class were expected to live in houses with high walls to reduce exposure from other men. However, lower-class women worked with men in the fields, most often on the family farm.

By the end of the era, women almost became "nameless" in Korea. They were referred to mostly by their husband's or children's names ("...'s wife", "...'s mother"), completely different from the British situation were a married woman would be called "Mrs...".

Notes

References
 
 
 
 
 

Joseon dynasty
Social history of Korea